was a district in Hiroshima, Japan. on April 1, 2004, all six towns and villages  in this district, along with the town of Kōnu in Kōnu District, were merged with old Miyoshi to form the new Miyoshi.

Towns and villages
 Funo
 Kimita
 Kisa
 Mirasaka
 Miwa
 Sakugi

Former districts of Hiroshima Prefecture